Sibu Rural District Council (Malay: Majlis Daerah Luar Bandar Sibu) (MDLBS or SRDC) is a local authority which administers Sibu rural areas such as Sibu Jaya and Selangau District. The agency is under the purview of Ministry of Local Government & Housing Sarawak (MLGH). The establishment of this council is to provide basic amenities, public infrastructure, and professional services to the population under its jurisdiction.

History 

The roots of SRDC can be dated back to 1940s where it was known as "Dayak Local Authority" which was under the chairmanship of Penghulu Imai. Its members were made up of Iban local chiefs of Sibu. The name was changed to "Local Authority Sibu" after it was put under the administration of British Colonial Officers.

Administration 
SRDC currently administers part of the Sibu District and Selangau District covering a total area of 6,000 km2. The area of administration contains a total of 60,000 population which are mainly Ibans. In 1981, due to a delineation exercise, one of the areas under SRDC was incorporated into Sibu Municipal Council (SMC). Another area known as Igan region was taken over by Matu-Daro District Council in October 1991.

Management 
HEAD OF DEPARTMENT

Secretary  

Mr. Sait Ak Enggang Pegawai Tadbir, N48    

1.Management Services Division :  

Madam Teng Ming Min Pegawai Tadbir, N44 

1.1 General Administration Section :

Mr. Hiu Kee Sing Pegawai Tadbir, N41

1.2 Human Resource Section : 

Ms. Elizabeth Rabai anak Usin Penolong Pegawai Tadbir, N32

1.3 Finance Section :

Mr. Wong Papk Tung Penolong Akauntan, W32 (Treasurer)

2. Engineering Division : 

Mr. Jacky Tiong Ket Chiing Jurutera, J41

3. Urban Health and Services Division : 

Madam Rity ak Jawa Penolong Pegawai Kesihatan Persekitaran, U32

4. Valuation and Property Management Division : 

Madam Fatin Flora Abdullah Penolong Pegawai Penilaian, W32

5. Enforcement Division : 

Mr. Bunyau Anak Salang Pembantu Penguatkuasa, KP29
 

6. Community Development Division : 

Mr. Rajkesh Jajba ak Frederick Taip Penolong Pegawai Tadbir, N29

6.1 Library Section : 

Mr. Ahmad Zaidie bin Arbi Pembantu Pustakawan, S22(KUP15)

Contact 
Mailing Address

Secretary,

Sibu Rural District Council 

Level 17 & 18, Wisma Sanyan, 

No. 1, Sanyan Road, 

P.O.Box 1318, 96007

Sibu, Sarawak,

MALAYSIA.

Telephone No.

084 - 336 077

Fax No.

084 - 324 694

E-mail Address 

mdlbs@sarawak.gov.my

Official Website 

http://www.srdc.gov.my/

Office Hours 
Monday to Thursday

0800 - 1300

1400 - 1700

Friday

0800 - 1145

1415 - 1700

Weekend and Public Holiday 

Close

See also 
Sibu Municipal Council (SMC)

References

Sibu
Local government in Sarawak